The Republic of Pontus (Dimokratía tou Pódou) was a proposed Pontic Greek state on the southern coast of the Black Sea. Its territory would have encompassed much of historical Pontus and today forms part of Turkey's Black Sea Region. The proposed state was discussed at the Paris Peace Conference of 1919, but the Greek government of Eleftherios Venizelos feared the precarious position of such a state and so it was included instead in the larger proposed state of Wilsonian Armenia. Ultimately, however, neither state came into existence and the Pontic Greek population was killed and expelled from Turkey after 1922 and resettled in the Soviet Union or in Greek Macedonia. This state of affairs was later formally recognized as part of the population exchange between Greece and Turkey in 1923. In modern Greek political circles, the exchange is seen as inextricable from the contemporaneous Greek genocide.

History

Greek colonies were established on the Pontus coast in 800 BC, and by the time of the conquests of Alexander the Great the local inhabitants were already heavily Hellenized. By the 4th century AD Greek had become the sole spoken language in the region, and it would remain so for a thousand years, first under the Byzantine Empire and then the Empire of Trebizond, a Byzantine successor state. In 1461 the Ottoman Empire conquered Pontus, but the remote mountainous region remained predominately Greek speaking for centuries more.

In the early 1830s, the modern Greek state achieved independence, but with less territory than it holds today. Megali Idea made further claims on Greek-populated territories elsewhere. The Pontic Greeks were far from the new Greek state, and had few connections to it, so joining the new Greece was never strongly considered. At that time, many Pontic Greeks migrated to the much closer orthodox states of Russia and Georgia.

In 1904 a secret society, the Pontus Society, was founded in Merzifon whose main purpose was achieving an independent republic of Pontus. The movement gained significant support and during the 1910s and 1920s, the Metropolitan of Trabzon Chrysanthos Filippides, who would later become the Archbishop of Athens, became a major leader in pushing for an independent Republic of Pontus. International societies of Pontic Greeks became connected with the Pontus Society in Merzifon and began significant lobbying efforts to push for an independent Pontic Greek state: most prominently in Russia and the United States. During this period, Leonidas Iasonidis became a primary leader in the movement for the establishment of a Republic of Pontus.

In 1916, during World War I, Trabzon fell to the forces of the Russian Empire, fomenting the idea of an independent Pontic state. With the Russian Revolution, Russian forces withdrew from the region to take part in the Russian Civil War (1917–1923).

Like Armenians, Assyrians and other Ottoman Greeks, the Greeks of Trebizond province suffered a genocide at the beginning of the 20th century, first by the Young Turks and later by Kemalist forces. In both cases, motivation was the fear of the Turks on losing the territory sooner or later to the local indigenous populations of Greeks, Assyrians and Armenians and the policy of turkification. Death marches through Turkey's mountainous terrain, forced labour in the infamous "Labour battalions" in Anatolia and slaughter by the irregular bands of Topal Osman resulted in approximately 350,000 of Pontic Greeks perishing from 1914 to 1922. The Greek population of the city itself was however not targeted directly, as the local authorities refused to supply mass murderer Topal with weapons, and local Turks forced his band out of the city. The local Muslims of the city protested the arrest of prominent Christians.

Pontic Greeks that escaped the death marches went on to the mountains with women and children, and formed self-defense groups that were protecting the Greek and Armenian population, until the population agreement exchange in 1923. The self-defense groups are believed to have saved the lives of more than 60 thousand Pontic Greeks and Armenians.

On January 8, 1918, U.S. President Woodrow Wilson enunciated his Fourteen Points towards a post-war order. Point Twelve specified that the non-Turkish nationalities "which are now under Turkish rule should be assured an undoubted security of life and an absolutely unmolested opportunity of autonomous development." This declaration led to significant activity to organize on the part of non-Turkish populations throughout Anatolia, including the Pontus region. Wilson actively supported the creation of the Republic of Pontus, voting for its independence from the Ottoman Empire during the Paris Peace Conference. In 1918–1919, Greek Prime Minister Eleftherios Venizelos began a process of financial payment for repatriation of Pontic Greeks who had resettled in Russia during the violence before and during World War I.

Following the Armistice of Mudros which ended World War I hostilities between the Allied powers and the Ottoman Empire, British troops landed in Samsun and occupied much of the region.

At about the same time, with the beginning of the negotiations at the Paris Peace Conference, 1919 to decide territorial issues in the Ottoman Empire, Chrysanthos arrived at negotiations to push for an independent Pontus on April 29, 1919. While there he presented an 18-page memorandum of support for the establishment of a Republic of Pontus. The proposed Republic of Pontus was to include the districts of Trabzon, Samsun, Sinop, and Amasya and cover much of the northeast Black Sea region of modern Turkey.

At the Conference, Venizelos believed that an independent Republic of Pontus would be too remote for military assistance from Greece and too weak to defend itself against any Turkish attack. For this reason he opposed the creation of a Republic of Pontus and the discussion was largely ended. Later, it was suggested that the district of Trabzon become part of the newly created Armenian state by Venizelos, but this idea did not gain traction with the Allied Powers and violence in the area as a result of the Turkish–Armenian War, the Turkish War of Independence, and the Bolshevik takeover of Armenia soon muted the discussion. In May 1919, the head of the Greek Red Cross for the Pontus region wrote a report indicating that security for the population was very precarious and assistance was necessary.

In 1921 large part of the Orthodox Christian males of Pontus were deported and sent to labour battalions at Erzerum. During this time an "Ad hoc Court of Turkish Independence" in Amasya, which was controlled by the Turkish nationalists of Mustafa Kemal (later Atatürk), sentenced several notable figures to death by hanging. Among them was the former member of the Ottoman parliament, Matthaios Kofidis. They were charged of supporting the independence movement of Pontus.

Demographics 

An Ottoman statistical report in 1914 recorded the Greek population (excluding the Greek Muslims) at no more than 350,000, around 17% of the population; though there are no accurate statistics for the population of Greeks in the Ottoman Empire, with figures compiled by Ottoman authorities being deemed unreliable, in particular for Ottoman Greeks who tended to avoid registering with Muslim authorities to avoid military service and to minimize their taxes. According to the statistics of the Ecumenical Patriarchate of Constantinople, the Greek population of Pontus prior of World War I, was 650,000. Likewise, an official report by the Greek Ministry of Foreign Affairs at the time, wrote that the Greek population was 700,000 prior of WWI; a number that was officially recognized by the Ottoman government of Kâmil Pasha in 1912, when after having reached an agreement with the Patriarchate, the number of parliamentary seats for the Greeks of Pontus was set at 7 (or 1 Greek MP for every 100,000 inhabitants). Sergei Rudolfovich Mintslov published a survey in 1916, stating that the regions of Platana and Trabzon were 32.4% Greeks. In a memorandum signed in February 1919, and presented to the Paris Peace Conference, a local Greek delegation calling for the self-determination of Pontus, stated that the pre-genocide Greek population of Pontus was 700,000, without counting an additional 350,000 who fled Turkish persecution several years prior; Pontus also had minorities of Turks, Circassians, Armenians, Tartars and Turcomans.

Aftermath
A large part of the Pontic Greek community resettled during the fighting and after the Treaty of Lausanne in 1923, as part of the Greek and Turkish population exchange. Records find that 182,169 Pontic Greeks were displaced as part of the population exchange. Many of the Pontic Greeks left for the Soviet Union, which had been the site of earlier Pontic migrations and thus had family connections. Most of the rest migrated to Greece where they were given full citizenship rights (Pontic Greeks who migrate from Russia today receive similar privileges). In Greece the Pontic migrants were called Póndii.

See also
Pontus
Black Sea Region
Caucasus Greeks
Wilsonian Armenia
Greek genocide
Greek refugees

References

History of Greece (1909–1924)
Ottoman Empire in World War I
Turkish War of Independence
Proposed countries
Kastamonu vilayet
Trebizond vilayet
Sivas vilayet
History of Trabzon Province
History of Samsun Province
History of Ordu Province
History of Rize Province
History of Giresun Province
History of Amasya Province
History of Tokat Province